Helicella striatitala is a species of air-breathing land snails, terrestrial pulmonate gastropod mollusks in the family Geomitridae, the hairy snails and their allies.

Distribution

This species is endemic to Spain.

References

 Bank, R. A.; Neubert, E. (2017). Checklist of the land and freshwater Gastropoda of Europe. Last update: July 16th, 2017

External links
 Prieto, C.E. (1985). Helicella striatitala sp. nov. (Gastropoda, Helicidae) del N. de la Península Ibérica. Iberus, 5: 53-58.

Endemic molluscs of the Iberian Peninsula
Helicella
Endemic fauna of Spain
Gastropods described in 1985
Taxonomy articles created by Polbot